Fernando Campos Harriet (1910–2003) was a Chilean lawyer and historian.

20th-century Chilean lawyers
Legal historians
20th-century Chilean historians
20th-century Chilean male writers
21st-century Chilean historians
21st-century Chilean male writers
1910 births
2003 deaths